Charles Lumley  (c. 1693–1728) was a British politician who sat in the House of Commons from 1727 to 1728.
 
Lumley was the fifth son of Richard Lumley, 1st Earl of Scarbrough, of Lumley Castle, county Durham, and Stanstead, near Chichester, Sussex, and his wife Frances Jones, daughter of Sir Henry Jones of Aston, Oxfordshire. 
 
Lumley was Equerry to the Prince of Wales from 1718 and then, from about 1726, groom of the bedchamber to George II as Prince of Wales and King. He was returned unopposed for Chichester at the 1727 British general election on the joint interests of his brother Lord Scarbrough and the Duke of Richmond.

Lumley died unmarried on 11 August 1728. He was the brother of James Lumley, John Lumley  and Thomas Lumley who were all MPs.

References

1690s births
1728 deaths
Members of the Parliament of Great Britain for English constituencies
British MPs 1727–1734
Younger sons of earls